Abū az-Zibriqān ʿAbd ar-Raḥmān ibn ʿAbd al-Hādī Dāmullā al-Kāshgharī an-Nadwī (15 September 1912 – March 1971), or simply Abdur Rahman Kashgari, was one of the leading scholars of the Arabic language and literature in the Indian subcontinent. Of Uyghur background, Kashgari migrated from East Turkestan to India at an early age, completing his studies in Lucknow where he became an accomplished Islamic scholar, linguist, poet and author. He then migrated to Bengal (present-day Bangladesh), where he eventually became the principal of Dhaka Alia Madrasa. Kashgari was also the first khatib of the Baitul Mukarram National Mosque, holding this role until his death.

Early life and education 
Abdur Rahman was born in the village of Tashmiliq in Kashgar, East Turkestan (present-day Xinjiang, China). His father, Abdul Hadi Damolla, was a local Uyghur mullah popularly referred to as Beit-Akhunum. As a result of instability in their home region following the 1911 Revolution and the establishment of the Republic of China, his father, elder brother and two sisters were arrested by the new regime and the family property was taken away. His maternal uncle suggested to Abdur Rahman's mother that they join the Muslim refugee groups migrating to the subcontinent with the assistance of a guerrilla force. However, Abdur Rahman's mother hoped for her family to eventually be freed and so she remained in Kashgar though Abdur Rahman was keen on furthering his Islamic studies in India.

Abdur Rahman's initial education began under the local Islamic scholars in Kashgar. After leaving behind his family in Kashgar, eleven-year old Abdur Rahman joined the caravan towards India. They passed through Karakol and the Pamir Mountains, eventually reaching a place called Dukhan in Afghanistan. From there, they reached a place called Barik near Fayzabad, Badakhshan. From there, they reached Chitral via Zebak where they received assistance from Mehtar Amir ul-Mulk, and subsequently went to Dargai. After months of walking on foot, they finally went from Dargai to Amritsar via rail. The adviser there appeared in the services of Maulana Abdullah Minhas, in whose name the Mehtar of Chitral had kindly written a letter of recommendation. According to the Mehtar's instructions, he served Abdul Hye Hasani, principal of the Darul Uloom Nadwatul Ulama in Lucknow, British India. Finding refuge in the Nadwatul Ulama orphanage in 1922, he became a student at the same institute up-to higher level, gaining a strong grounding in the Islamic sciences such as Hadith studies, tafsir, Arabic literature and other subjects under Abdul Hye Hasani. He graduated from Nadwatul Ulama in 1347 AH (1929 CE). He then went on to study at the University of Lucknow where he received a Fazil-e-Adab degree. Kashgari received a certificate in the seven qira'at from the Madrasa-e-Furqania.

Career
After completing his studies, Kashgari became a teacher at his alma mater, the Darul Uloom Nadwatul Ulama. At the request of A. K. Fazlul Huq, the Prime Minister of Bengal, who visited him in Lucknow, Kashgari moved to Bengal where he became a teacher at the Calcutta Alia Madrasa in 1938. In Calcutta, he taught Islamic jurisprudence and its principles. After the Partition of Bengal in 1947, Kashgari moved to Dacca, East Bengal. He began teaching at the Dhaka Alia Madrasa where he also served as a hostel superintendent. In 1955, he was promoted to assistant head mawlana of the institution, and became the head mawlana (principal) from 1969 until his death. Among his students were Muhammad Fakhruddin (bn), Muhiuddin Khan, Nurul Islam Hashemi, Syed Fazlur Rahman and Abu Mahfuz Al-Karim Masumi. In 1963, he was appointed as the first khatib of the newly-built Baitul Mukarram National Mosque and he served in this position until the end of his life. Kashgari was also a member of the Anjuman Mufidul Islam organisation.

Works
Kashgari has written many works pertaining to Arabic language and has also composed Islamic poetry in Arabic. Among his books are:
Dīwān az-Zahrāt (Lucknow, 1935) 
Al-Ḥadīqah (Incorporated into the dakhil grade curriculum for Alia madrasahs by the Madrasah Education Board)
Al-Mufīd liman yastafīd (Dhaka, 1961; a two-volume trilingual dictionary of Arabic, Bengali and Urdu
Al-Miḥbar fi al-Mudhakkar wa al-Muannath
Amthāl al-Lughatayn (Comparison of Arabic and Urdu proverbs)
Maḥak an-Naqd (a commentary on Qudama ibn Ja'far's Naqd ash-Shiʿr)
 Commentary on Sher Ibn Muqbil al-ʿAdlānī
 Commentary on Niẓām al-Lasad fī Asmāʾ al-Asad by Al-Suyuti
 An Arabic translation and commentary of Izālah al-Khafāʾ ʿan Khilāfah al-Khulafāʾ by Shah Waliullah Dehlawi
 Extractions from Asmāʾ al-Asad and Asmāʾ adh-Dhiʾb by Radi ad-Din Hasan as-Saghani 
Dīwān al-ʿIbrāt (unpublished poetry)
Dīwān ash-Shadhrāt (unpublished poetry) 
Farhang-e-Kāshgarī (unpublished poetry)

Personal life
Kashgarhi remained a bachelor for his entire life. He had pet kittens.

Death
Kashgarhi died towards the end of March 1971, in Dacca, East Pakistan (present-day Bangladesh). He was buried in Azimpur Graveyard. One of his students, Abu Mahfuz Al-Karim Masumi, wrote a lengthy obituary for the fortnightly Al-Raid in Lucknow.

Notes

References

Further reading

1912 births
1971 deaths
Darul Uloom Nadwatul Ulama alumni
University of Lucknow alumni
Academic staff of Darul Uloom Nadwatul Ulama
People from Dhaka
Khatib of the national mosque of Bangladesh
Bangladeshi people of Uyghur descent
Uyghur people
Uyghur writers
Burials at Azimpur Graveyard
Lexicographers of Arabic
20th-century lexicographers
People from Shufu County